Sala Parish is a territorial unit of Jēkabpils Municipality in the Selonia region of Latvia. From 2009 until 2021, it was part of the former Sala Municipality. Prior to 2009, it was part of the former Jēkabpils District.

Villages 
 Sala (parish and municipality centre)
 Birži

Parishes of Latvia
Jēkabpils Municipality
Selonia